"Letting Go" is a song written by Doug Crider and Matt Rollings, and recorded by American country music artist Suzy Bogguss. It was released in July 1992 as the fourth single from her album Aces. The song reached number 6 on the Billboard Hot Country Singles & Tracks chart in October 1992. It also reached number 83 on the UK pop charts, on February 13, 1993.

Critical reception
Billboard gave the song a positive review, saying that it was "unquestionably superb" and had potential for Adult Contemporary crossover. Indeed, the song did cross over and reach #26 on the Gavin Adult Contemporary survey, on October 9, 1992.

Chart performance

References

1992 singles
Suzy Bogguss songs
Song recordings produced by Jimmy Bowen
Liberty Records singles
Music videos directed by Deaton-Flanigen Productions
1991 songs